The International Wellbeing at Work (WAW) series of academic conferences is relatively new in the field of occupational safety and health. WAW has been held biannually since 2010 and attracts researchers and practitioners of the field. In 2016, WAW 2016 was hosted by TNO  in Amsterdam;  in 2014, by NRCWE in Copenhagen .  WAW 2012 was held in Manchester, Great Britain; The WAW 2019 in Paris. The local organizer of this edition was INRS. In 2020, CIOP-PIB organized the edition on-line on the theme of Wellbeing at Work in Hectic Times.

The organization of this cycle of conferences is supported by the PEROSH "Wellbeing and Work" project group.

Perosh in the European Network for Research on Occupational Safety and Health. Wellbeing at work is considered a strategic component of OSH in Europe.

It is not to be confused with the Health and Wellbeing at Work Conference, which is a purely commercial event, held only in UK,

Past and future Wellbeing at Work conferences
Past and future Wellbeing at Work conferences include:

References

External links
 WAW 2016 website

Occupational safety and health
Quality of life